Andover Township may refer to:

Andover Township, Henry County, Illinois
Andover Township, Minnesota
Andover Township, New Jersey
Andover Township, Ashtabula County, Ohio

Township name disambiguation pages